Derwentia is the scientific name of two genera of organisms and may refer to:

Derwentia (amphibian), a genus of prehistoric amphibians in the family Rhytidosteidae
Derwentia (plant), a genus of plants in the family Plantaginaceae